Anna Irene Molberg (born 5 August 1990) is a Norwegian politician.

She was elected representative to the Storting from the constituency of Hedmark for the period 2021–2025, for the Conservative Party.

She was deputy representative to the Storting from 2009 to 2013.

References

1990 births
Living people
Conservative Party (Norway) politicians
Hedmark politicians
Members of the Storting
Women members of the Storting